Perry Everett Grimm (November 3, 1888 – January 12, 1974) was an American football and basketball coach.  He was the head football coach at Adrian College in Adrian, Michigan for two seasons, from the 1916 to 1917, compiling a record of 1–3.  Grimm was also the head basketball coach at Adrian from 1916 to 1918, tallying a mark of 11–14.

Head coaching record

Football

References

External links
 

1888 births
1974 deaths
Adrian Bulldogs football coaches
Adrian Bulldogs men's basketball coaches
People from Ravenswood, West Virginia